Wild Turkey is a brand of Kentucky straight bourbon whiskey distilled and bottled by the Wild Turkey Distilling Co, a division of Campari Group. The distillery is located near Lawrenceburg, Kentucky. It offers tours and is part of the American Whiskey Trail and the Kentucky Bourbon Trail.

History 
In 1891, Thomas Ripy built the Old Hickory Distillery in Tyrone, Kentucky, near Lawrenceburg, on the former site of the Old Moore Distillery. After Prohibition, the Ripy family (Thomas had died in 1902) rebuilt the distillery and began to again produce bourbon. The Ripys sold the bourbon produced at this distillery to various wholesalers who bottled bourbon under their own brands. Austin Nichols was one of these wholesalers. 

The "Wild Turkey" brand is said to have arisen after an Austin Nichols executive, Thomas McCarthy, took some warehouse samples on a wild turkey hunting trip in 1940. The bourbon proved so popular among his friends they continued to ask him for "that wild turkey bourbon." Austin Nichols began to bottle Wild Turkey in 1942. 

The Ripys were bought out in 1949 by Robert and Alvin Gould.

For the next three decades, Austin Nichols remained a non-distiller producer—bottling bourbon purchased on the open market under the Wild Turkey brand. Much of this whiskey was purchased from the Ripys/Gould distillery in Tyrone.  In 1971, Austin Nichols purchased the facility, then known as the Boulevard Distillery, and changed the name to the Wild Turkey Distillery.

In 1980, the distillery and the Wild Turkey brand were purchased by Pernod Ricard.

On May 9, 2000, a fire destroyed a seven-story aging warehouse at the company in Anderson County, Kentucky. It contained more than 17,000 wooden barrels of whiskey. Burning whiskey flowed from the warehouse and setting the woods on fire. Firefighters saved Lawrenceburg's water treatment plant from destruction. However, an estimated 20% of the whiskey flowed into the Kentucky River. The river contamination required the temporary shutdown of the water treatment plant. Officials ordered water usage restrictions. Businesses and schools were closed because of the water shortage. The alcohol spill also depleted the oxygen in the river, killing an estimated 228,000 fish along a 66-mile stretch. The EPA and the Coast Guard's Gulf Strike Team aerated the river using equipment mounted on barges. The company paid $256,000 to the Kentucky Department of Fish and Wildlife in an effort to restore the fish population in the river.

In 2009, the Campari Group acquired the distillery and the Wild Turkey brand from Pernod Ricard.

In 2011, Wild Turkey began to be distilled at a newly constructed facility near the old distillery. The new distillery sits where the old bottling facility was previously located. 

In 2013, Campari opened a new bottling facility at the Wild Turkey Distillery. For the previous 13 years Wild Turkey had been bottled offsite in Indiana and, later, Arkansas. In addition to the Wild Turkey products, Campari's SKYY vodka is also bottled there after being shipped from the Illinois distillery.

Production
Wild Turkey uses a mash consisting of a relatively lower percentage of corn than most bourbons and attempts are made to counteract the alkaline environment of the company's limestone-rich water. Additionally, the raw whiskey is distilled to about 55% alcohol by volume, much lower than the legally allowed maximum to be considered bourbon. Barrels are rotated in open houses to allow more even maturation, being aged until at least one third of the contents to be lost to evaporation before they are considered for bottling.

Products
 
The Lawrenceburg distillery bottles its bourbon and rye under the brands of "Wild Turkey" and "Russell's Reserve".

Wild Turkey
Wild Turkey 81 Proof
Wild Turkey 81 Proof Rye
Wild Turkey 101 Proof
Wild Turkey 101 Proof Rye
Wild Turkey Rare Breed (a barrel proof blend of 6, 8 and 12-year-old stocks)
Wild Turkey Kentucky Spirit (a single barrel 101 proof bourbon)
Wild Turkey Longbranch (86 proof bourbon refined with oak and Texas mesquite charcoal)
Wild Turkey Master's Keep 17 Year (100 proof)
Wild Turkey Master's Keep Decades (104 proof)
Wild Turkey Master's Keep Revival (101 proof)

Russell's Reserve (named for Jimmy Russell, Wild Turkey's master distiller)    
Russell’s Reserve 13 year ((114.2 proof)2022 Batch))
Russell's Reserve 10 year (90 proof)
Russell's Reserve Rye 6 Year (90 proof)
Russell's Reserve Single Barrel Rye (104 proof)
Russell's Reserve Single Barrel (110 proof)

 Wild Turkey Master's Keep Cornerstone (109 proof) is the oldest Rye released by Wild Turkey to date. 

 Wild Turkey Rare Breed Barrel Rye (112.2 proof) The rye whiskey is bottled at 112.2 proof and brings a rye recipe, for the first time, to the family of Wild Turkey barrel-proof releases. 

Flavored
American Honey
American Honey Sting

Awards

In 2012, Wild Turkey 101 earned an 'Editor's Choice' award from Whisky Magazine. An aggregator from various "expert" body reviews places the 101 Single Barrel in the 97th percentile of all rated bourbons.

Advertising campaigns

"Give 'em the Bird" 
In 2011, an advertisement video called "Give 'em the Bird" was featured on the product's web site, Facebook page, and YouTube page that prominently included a middle finger gesture and referred to other (non-existing) advertising videos featuring a nun and an adult blow-up doll.
 
In August 2011, the review board of the Distilled Spirits Council of the United States (DISCUS), of which Campari USA is a member, ruled that the advertisement violated the council's code of ethical practices and said that "the gesture is indecent and the advertisement fails to meet contemporary standards of good taste". According to DISCUS, the company disagreed with the board's interpretation but agreed to withdraw the advertisement.

Since then, the company has continued to use the "Give 'em the Bird" slogan and middle finger gesturing in additional advertising and promotional activities. In November 2012, Jimmy Russell, the Wild Turkey Master Distiller, publicly called for U.S. President Barack Obama to "Give us the bird", as a way of offering to provide a home for that year's White House Thanksgiving Day turkey (which is traditionally "pardoned" by the president) – saying the turkey would become the brand's official "spokesbird".

Matthew McConaughey 
In 2016, Matthew McConaughey was hired as creative director and celebrity spokesman for Wild Turkey's latest campaign, to bring in more women and international customers.

In popular culture
Wild Turkey is known for having a number of avian-themed nicknames given to its products, such as the Dirty Bird, the Screaming Eagle, and the Kicking Chicken.

Literature

Wild Turkey is known for being a favorite drink of journalist Hunter S. Thompson, and is mentioned in his 1972 book Fear and Loathing in Las Vegas (as well as the film of the same name), and the 1973 book Fear and Loathing on the Campaign Trail '72. In Stephen King's book It, when asked what the bar whiskey is, the bartender replies, "For everyone else in this dump it's Four Roses, but for you I think it's Wild Turkey." David Foster Wallace's novel Infinite Jest has James Incandenza as an alcoholic filmmaker and tennis academy head who drinks Wild Turkey, as well as being referenced as Wallace's drink of choice in his biography, Every Love Story is a Ghost Story. In Scott Sigler's science fiction book Infected, main character Perry Dawsey is described several times as drinking Wild Turkey. In Patrick Neate's 2004 book City of Tiny Lights the private investigator anti-hero and narrator of the tale, Tommy Akhtar, subsists on a diet of mostly Wild Turkey and Benson and Hedges cigarettes, referring to them as "Benny and the Turk". In Adrian Edmondson's 1995 novel The Gobbler, the hard-drinking central protagonist, Julian Mann, has a penchant for Wild Turkey, particularly in combination with pints of lager.

Film
The bourbon is the drink of choice for characters in First Blood, The Cassandra Crossing, Rush, Mystic River, In the Heat of the Night, Silver Bullet, Who Framed Roger Rabbit, Bad Lieutenant, Barb Wire, The Eiger Sanction, Fear and Loathing in Las Vegas, The Punisher, Where the Buffalo Roam, and The Guardian. It is also referenced in numerous films, including The Color of Money, Let It Ride, National Lampoon's Christmas Vacation, With Honors, Thelma & Louise, Death Proof, Monster's Ball, Freddy Got Fingered, Out Cold, Crazy Heart,  Cookie's Fortune, Frankenhooker, Trees Lounge, Dead Man Walking and Tammy.

Television
NCIS and Justified routinely shows characters with a bottle of the product, and on occasion television shows have made references to it, including Buffy the Vampire Slayer (episode "Beer Bad"), The Sopranos (season 3, episode 10), Seinfeld (season 7, episode "The Hot Tub", also season 5's episode "The Dinner Party" shows George holding a bottle), Trigun, True Blood (season 3, episode "Beautifully Broken"), "Frasier" (season 2, episode "Roz in the Doghouse"), "A Very Peculiar Practice" (season 2, episode "May the Force Be with You"), Will & Grace (season 7), "Married... with Children" (season 8, episode "Nooner or Nothing"), and Halt and Catch Fire (TV series) (season 3, episode 10). On the season 2 episode "Sweetums" of Parks and Recreation, Ron Swanson mentions his old man used to put Wild Turkey on his Cornflakes, while explaining why his family has a preternaturally high tolerance for alcohol. The title character in Jessica Jones is frequently shown drinking from a bottle of Wild Turkey 101, while ads for Wild Turkey can be seen on the walls of Josie's Bar in Daredevil.

Music
"Wild Turkey" was the title of a 1982 top-ten country single for singer Lacy J. Dalton.

The cover art of the Pantera album Reinventing the Steel shows a shirtless man jumping through fire while holding a bottle of Wild Turkey. The label is pixelated to avoid trademark infringement, following the controversy over the original cover art of the Black Label Society album Sonic Brew.

The Nashville duo Birdcloud released a single called “Wild Turkey 101” in 2018.

References

External links

Wild Turkey Bourbon
Wild Turkey Bourbon Australian Website

Bourbon whiskey
Distilleries in Kentucky
Campari Group
Alcoholic drink brands
Food processing disasters